Lunestedt is a railway station situated on the Cuxhaven to Bremen line. It is situated in the village of Lunestedt in the district of Cuxhaven in Lower Saxony, one of the states of Germany.

Operational usage 
RegionalBahn trains from Bremerhaven to Bremen call at the station, offering an hourly connection to both cities, with some peak services during the early morning and afternoon hours.

References 

Buildings and structures in Cuxhaven (district)
Railway stations in Lower Saxony
Bremen S-Bahn